Boyle–Hudspeth-Benson House is located in the Millington section of Long Hill Township, Morris County, New Jersey, United States. The house was built in 1750 and added to the National Register of Historic Places on February 10, 1975.

See also
National Register of Historic Places listings in Morris County, New Jersey

References

Houses on the National Register of Historic Places in New Jersey
Houses completed in 1750
Houses in Morris County, New Jersey
National Register of Historic Places in Morris County, New Jersey
New Jersey Register of Historic Places
Long Hill Township, New Jersey